The 1992–93 season was the 91st season in which Dundee competed at a Scottish national level, playing in the Scottish Premier Division after winning the First Division the previous season. Dundee would finish 10th, 5 points clear of relegation. Dundee would also compete in both the Scottish League Cup and the Scottish Cup, where they were knocked out by Celtic in the 4th round of the League Cup, and by Heart of Midlothian in the 4th round of the Scottish Cup.

Scottish Premier Division 

Statistics provided by Dee Archive.

League table

Scottish League Cup 

Statistics provided by Dee Archive.

Scottish Cup 

Statistics provided by Dee Archive.

Player statistics 
Statistics provided by Dee Archive

|}

See also 

 List of Dundee F.C. seasons

References

External links 

 1992–93 Dundee season on Fitbastats

Dundee F.C. seasons
Dundee